Hold Back My Heart is the third studio album by 2008 American Idol contestant Michael Johns.  It sold a total of 20,000 copies.

Track listing
"Heart on My Sleeve"(James Morrison) -3:41
"To Love Somebody" (Barry Gibb, Robin Gibb) -3:16
"Feeling Alright" -2:58
"Little Bear" -2:58
"Fools Gold" -5:52
"Mountains" -3:49
"Fire" -2:35
"Hold Back My Heart" -4:48
"This Is Goodbye" -4:55
"It's Too Late" -3:41
"Heart Is Weak" -4:10 (Diane Warren)
"Turn To You" -3:30

Personnel
Michael Johns- lead vocals
Dave Cobb- bass guitar, acoustic guitar, electric guitar
Sharlotte Gibson- background vocals
Dorian Holley- background vocals
Fred Mandel- keyboards
Chris Powell- drums
Alex Smith- background vocals
Texicali Horns- horns
Julia Waters- background vocals
Maxine Williard Waters- background vocals

References

2009 albums
Michael Johns (singer) albums
Albums produced by Dave Cobb